Eric Ochieng Opondo is a Kenyan former footballer who played as a midfielder for several Kenyan Premier League clubs including Red Berets, A.F.C. Leopards, Bandari, Gor Mahia, Wazito and Nairobi City Stars.

Ochieng turns out for second-tier side Kenyan National Super League Dandora Love as he pursues his coaching badges

He earned one cap for the Kenyan national team.

References

Living people
Kenyan footballers
Kenya international footballers
A.F.C. Leopards players
Association football midfielders
1982 births